Laker Airways (Bahamas) was an airline founded in 1992, which operated until 2005.

History
Laker Airways (Bahamas) was a US-registered airline based in the Bahamas to which Sir Freddie Laker lent his name and operational expertise. The airline was established in 1992 with financial assistance from Oscar Wyatt, a Texas oilman and business partner of Sir Freddie Laker. The initial fleet comprised two Boeing 727-200 Advanced narrow-bodied jet aircraft. Laker Airways (Bahamas) stopped operating in 2005 when the firm was wound up.

Laker Airways "Mark II"

In 1996 Sir Freddie Laker and his business partner Oscar Wyatt, a self-made Texas oilman, established Laker Airways, Inc. as a sister airline to Laker Airways (Bahamas) to follow in the original, UK-based Laker Airways footsteps. Laker Airways "Mark II" leased two McDonnell Douglas DC-10 widebodied jets to operate low-fare, high quality transatlantic scheduled services, which commenced on 5 July 1996 between Fort Lauderdale in Florida and London Gatwick at a frequency of two return flights per week. Additional scheduled services subsequently linked Orlando with Manchester and Glasgow Prestwick. Laker Airways, Inc. ceased operations in 1998.

Destinations in 1994 and 1995

According to the September 15, 1994 edition of the Official Airline Guide (OAG), Laker Airway (Bahamas) was operating nonstop Boeing 727-200 jet service between its main base in Freeport, Bahamas (FPO) and the following U.S. destinations:

 Baltimore, Maryland (BWI)
 Birmingham, Alabama (BHM)
 Chicago, Illinois - O'Hare International Airport (ORD)
 Fort Lauderdale, Florida (FLL)
 Greenville/Spartanburg, South Carolina (GSP)
 Memphis, Tennessee (MEM)
 Raleigh/Durham, North Carolina (RDU)
 Richmond, Virginia (RIC)
 West Palm Beach, Florida (PBI)

The April 2, 1995 OAG edition listed nonstop Laker 727 service between Freeport and the same U.S. cities above with the exception of Birmingham, Greenville and Memphis which were no longer served by the airline by this time with the following new destinations being served by Laker nonstop from Freeport as well:

 Cleveland, Ohio (CLE)
 Hartford, Connecticut/Springfield, Massachusetts - Bradley International Airport (BDL)

According to other OAG flight listings, additional U.S. cities were served at various times as well during the airline's existence.

Historical Fleet

Notes

References/External links

AirlinersNet Photos
Code and Aircraft Data

Airlines established in 1992
Airlines established in 1996
Airlines disestablished in 1998
Airlines disestablished in 2005
Defunct airlines of the Bahamas